Standings and results for Group 9 of the UEFA Euro 2000 qualifying tournament.

Standings

Matches

Goalscorers

Notes

References

Group 9
1998–99 in Scottish football
1999–2000 in Scottish football
1998–99 in Bosnia and Herzegovina football
1999–2000 in Bosnia and Herzegovina football
1998 in Lithuanian football
1999 in Lithuanian football
1998 in Estonian football
1999 in Estonian football
1998–99 in Czech football
1999–2000 in Czech football
Czech Republic at UEFA Euro 2000
1999 in Faroe Islands football
1998 in Faroe Islands football